The 1991–92 season was Sport Lisboa e Benfica's 88th season in existence and the club's 58th consecutive season in the top flight of Portuguese football, covering the period from 1 July 1991 to 30 June 1992. Benfica competed domestically in the Primeira Divisão and the Taça de Portugal, and participated in the European Cup by winning the previous league.

Entering the season as defending champions, the third year of Sven-Göran Eriksson was less successful than before. During the transfer season, Benfica lost two important players – Ricardo Gomes and Valdo to Paris Saint-Germain. As new signings, the club brought in Russians Vasili Kulkov and Sergei Yuran, and promoted youth graduates Paulo Madeira and Rui Costa to regular starters. In the league race, Benfica competed with Porto until January, when a three-point gap opened, and a subsequent home loss against them two months later, ended hopes of retaining the title. Still, the team made history when it defeated Arsenal in Highbury to qualify for the new format of the European Cup, now with a group stage.

Season summary
In his fifth year at Benfica, Swedish manager Sven-Göran Eriksson had to rebuild a new eleven, following the departures of Ricardo Gomes and Valdo to Paris Saint-Germain. After two seasons as back-up, Paulo Madeira had its breakthrough season alongside William, amassing 47 appearances, second-best in the squad. To replace Valdo, Eriksson opted for the 19 year-old, Rui Costa, which had just returned from a successful loan spell at AD Fafe. Benfica also made a few signings, notably Vasili Kulkov and Sergei Yuran, both internationals for the Soviet Union.

Benfica entered their league campaign with a home loss to Boavista. In the following weeks, they recovered the lost ground, and finished September in fourth place, only a point from first. In the same month, the team started their European Cup run with a 10–0 win on aggregate over Hamrun Spartans. On 3 November, Benfica draws the first Clássico of the year, at Estádio das Antas, as the two teams were now matched in second. Three days later, in the second round of the European Cup, Benfica visited Highbury and knocked Arsenal out of the competition, with a 3–1 win, in part due to the individual efforts from Isaías, who bagged a double. It was the first time since 1961–62 that the club defeated a team from England, and granted a spot on the newly created group stages of the tournament. November ended with mixed results, they were joint-first on the league, but lost their European Cup opening game against Dynamo Kyiv.

In December, the team collected two wins and two draws in the domestic league, making them trail Porto by a point at the New Year. Similar situation happened in Europe, after a home draw to Barcelona, they were last at their group after the second match-day. However, in the other competitions, they opened the Portuguese Cup with a win and beat Porto on the first leg of the Supercup. In January, three win less match-days that spread from 29 December to 19 January, which included a second loss to Boavista, increased Porto's gap to three points on the title race, while on the second league of the Supercup, a one-nil loss, postponed the trophy decision until September.

After a fruitful February, in which the team bagged 9 points out of 10 possible, they entered March still chasing Porto who retained the same lead. After a second home draw in the European Cup, on 4 March against Sparta Prague, Benfica postponed the league match of 15th, to better focus in the return leg to Czechoslovakia. However the contend ended in another draw, and the three points in four match-days, Barcelona qualified for the final, as they had seven points. On the following Sunday in a decisive game for the title race, an 89th-minute goal from Ion Timofte gave Porto a 3–2 win at Estádio da Luz and increased their lead to five points. As consolation, the team beat Sporting de Espinho by 6–0 win in the quarter-finals of the Portuguese Cup, thus ensuring a third game against Boavista, on the semi-finals.

April ended any hopes of a silverware, as competitions dropped in succession. Despite recording a first win in the European Cup on 1 April, the closing match of the competition, at the Camp Nou, began a dark spell. With a 2–1 loss to Barcelona on the 15th, Benfica started a win less spree that cost them the two remaining competitions. On Saturday the 18th, the team draws to Farense at home. Four days later, Boavista knocks Benfica out of the Portuguese Cup final, beating them for a third time in the season. Next in consecutive away games, Benfica loses to Beira-Mar on the 26th and then awards the title to Porto on the 30th, after losing to Desportivo de Chaves, the delayed game from March. Benfica ended in second, 10 points away from Porto, with nine points dropped at home, from two losses to Boavista and Porto, and draws to Estori-Praia, Penafiel, Torreense, Salgueiros and Farense. Eriksson departed to Sampdoria at the end of season.

Competitions

Overall record

Supertaça Cândido de Oliveira

Primeira Divisão

League table

Results by round

Matches

Taça de Portugal

European Cup

First round

Second round

Group B

Friendlies

Player statistics
The squad for the season consisted of the players listed in the tables below, as well as staff member Sven-Goran Eriksson (manager) and Toni (assistant manager).

|}

Transfers

In

Out

Out by loan

References

Bibliography
 

S.L. Benfica seasons
Benfica